The Lover in Me is the ninth studio album by Scottish singer Sheena Easton. It was released in November 1988 and was her debut for MCA. The album has a more Urban/R&B sound than Easton's previous recordings due to the production by well-known acts such as L.A. Reid, Babyface and John "Jellybean" Benitez. The album's title track became a major hit, reaching #2 on the US Billboard Hot 100 and #15 on the UK Singles Chart. The album reached #44 on the US Billboard 200 and #30 in the UK Albums Chart, and was certified Gold by the RIAA. It is one of Easton's best selling albums to date and returned her to the US and UK charts. Significantly, in the UK it was her first charting album for over five years, with the lead single becoming her first top 20 hit in nearly eight years.

In 2006, Cherry Red Records (UK) re-released The Lover in Me, remastered and with added bonus tracks. On May 27, 2016, the album was officially released in the US for digital download on iTunes.

Single releases
The album's title track was the first single from the album to be released, reaching #2 on the US Billboard Hot 100, #5 on Billboard's Hot Black Singles chart, and #15 on the UK Singles Chart. Other singles from the album include "Days Like This" (#35 on the US R&B chart, UK #43) and "101" (UK #54 US Dance #2). "101" was written for Easton by Prince under the pseudonym Joey Coco (as was album track "(Cool Love"). One last single was released in the US; "No Deposit, No Return", but failed to chart.

"Follow My Rainbow" made #16 on the Dutch and New Zealand singles chart. It is featured in an episode (Deliver Us from Evil) of Miami Vice in which Easton's character 
(Caitlin Davies-Crockett) is singing the song minutes before her character is eliminated.

Reviews

Billboard magazine, December 1988: "The Lover In Me" shows Sheena Easton taking her career in a new direction. With production by L.A. & Babyface, Angela Winbush, Jellybean Benitez, and Prince, the album is smart, sexy, and soulful.

People magazine, December 5, 1988: Anyone who likes to see Maseratis used to plow snow or filet mignon ground into hamburger may like this record, in which Easton does a convincing imitation of a fourth-rate R&B singer. Maybe she got turned around by her collaboration with Prince, in which—during the U Got the Look video—she groveled around in a fashion that would have been humiliating to the most desperate starlet, let alone to a singer of Easton's stature and talent. Prince produced two of this album's 10 tracks (with little of the distinction he often shows on his own records), and the rest were done by such dance poppers as Babyface and Jellybean Benitez. Easton just blares away, fighting a losing battle against the rhythm backgrounds on the hotter tracks and sounding nondescript on the ballads, except Without You, where she sounds so much like Streisand it seems an outright imitation. That just accentuates the revolting developments of Easton's recent career.

Rolling Stone magazine, 1989: "The Lover In Me" (MCA) by Sheena Easton has got to be one of the most satisfying comeback albums this year. A new label and a clearer musical vision stretches Easton's vocal gifts considerably. Adopting a genuine R&B dance mode, the album's material overall is quite strong and is destined to garner Easton many new fans. Of the L.A. & Babyface productions on the album, the hit title track, "Days Like This" and "No Deposit, No Return" are the standouts featuring the production duo's customary style. One of our favorites is the Angela Winbush penned and produced "Fire and Rain," a sultry, soulful and very Isley-ish slow number that we hope clicks at radio.

Track listing
Side One
"No Deposit, No Return" (Babyface, Kayo, L.A. Reid, Daryl Simmons) 5:55
"The Lover in Me" (Babyface, Reid, Simmons) 5:02
"Follow My Rainbow" (Babyface) 4:55
"Without You" (Angela Winbush) 5:37
"If It's Meant to Last" (Danny Sembello, Allee Willis) 4:07

Side Two
"Days Like This" (Babyface, Reid, Simmons) 5:07
"One Love" (Babyface, Reid) 4:54
"101" (Joey Coco) 4:06
"Cool Love" (Coco) 4:03
"Fire and Rain" (Winbush) 5:56

2006 re-release bonus tracks
"The Lover in Me" (Extended Dub Version)
"Days Like This" (7' Version)
"101" (The Remix)
"No Deposit, No Return" (Radio Edit)

Personnel and production
 Sheena Easton: lead vocals, backing vocals (tracks 1, 2, 3, 6, 7 & 10)
 Tracks 1, 2, 3, 6 & 7 arranged, produced and mixed by L.A. Reid and Babyface; track 1 co-produced by Kayo. Recorded by Jon Gass. Kayo: bass (track 3), keyboards; Babyface: keyboards, backing vocals; L.A. Reid: drums, percussion; Larry Williams: saxophone (Track 2); The Deele: Rap (track 7). Karyn White (tracks 1, 2 & 6), Daryl Simmons (track 2) and Dee Bristol (track 7): backing vocals.
 Tracks 4 & 10 arranged and produced by Angela Winbush. Recorded by Mitch Bristol. Mixed by Jon Gass. Angela Winbush: acoustic piano, keyboards, synthesizers, drum programming; Jeff Lorber: synthesizers, drum programming; Tony Maiden and Danny Jacob: guitars; John Robinson: drums, percussion; Ray Griffin: tom-toms and synthesizers (track 10); Timothy B. Schmit: backing vocals (track 4).
 Track 5 arranged and produced by Jellybean Benitez.  Recorded by Dave McNair and Eddy DeLena. Mixed by Dave McNair and Jellybean Benitez. Felicia Collins: guitars; Dave LeBolt and Ed Terry: synthesizers; Jellybean Benitez: drums, percussion; Alfa Anderson, Janice Pendarvis and Robin Clark: backing vocals.
 Tracks 8 & 9 arranged and produced by Prince; track 9 co-produced by David Leonard. Track 8 recorded by Susan Rogers; track 9 recorded by Eddie Miller. Mixed by David Leonard. Prince: all instruments and programming.

Additional credits
 Assistant engineers: Toni Greene (tracks 1, 2, 3, 6 & 7); Fred Howard (tracks 1, 2, 6 & 7); Don Sullivan (tracks 1, 2, 6 & 7); Spence Chrislu (track 3); Jon Guggenheim (track 3); Dennis Stefani (tracks 4 & 10); Scott Gootman (track 5); Paul Logus (track 5); Jeff Poe (track 5); Dan Marnien (tracks 8 & 9).
 Recorded at Galaxy Sound Studios and Sunset Sound (Hollywood, CA); Elumba Studios, Silverlake Studios and Westlake Studios (Los Angeles, CA); Can-Am Recorders (Tarzana, CA); Sigma Sound Studios (New York, NY); Paisley Park Studios (Chanhassen, MN).
 Mixed at Elumba Studios; Larrabee West (West Hollywood, CA); Summa Music Group and The Grey Room (Hollywood, CA); The Hit Factory (New York, NY).
 Remixed at Elumba Studios and Summa Music Group.
 Mastered by Steve Hall at Future Disc (Hollywood, CA).
 Art direction: Jeff Adamoff
 Design: Michael Diehl
 Photography: Randee St. Nicholas
 Management: Harriet Wasserman at Gold Mountain Management.

Charts and certifications

Album

Singles

References

1988 albums
Sheena Easton albums
New jack swing albums
Albums produced by L.A. Reid
Albums produced by Babyface (musician)
Albums produced by Prince (musician)
MCA Records albums